Siyabonga Ricky Mayola (born 10 May 1988) is a South African actor and model. He is best known for his roles in the series Amaza, Projek Dina, Die Spreeus and Sara se Geheim.

Personal life
Mayola was born in Port Elizabeth, South Africa. His father was a teacher and mother was a nurse. He completed primary education at Victoria Park Grey and Sundridge Park Primary. Then he matriculated from Alexander Road High School. He took classes at the Stage World Theatre School in Port Elizabeth and performed in the local plays. He completed his degree at AFDA, The School for the Creative Economy.

Career
In 2011, he made his film debut as Baby Face in the Hollywood indie film 419 filmed in Cape Town. Then in 2012, he was cast in the stage play Faces Of Betrayal co-directed by Dr. Christopher John and Caroline Duck. In 2012, he appeared in the short film The Brave Unseen, for which he won the award for Best Supporting Actor at the annual AFDA awards. After the short, he shot the documentary Antartica for two and a half months. After his return in 2014, he joined the SABC1 youth drama series Amaza in the role of Bongani Mapanga. In 2016, he played Isaac in the Mzansi Magic drama Isikizi. 

Then in 2018, he joined the second season of kykNET drama Sara se Geheim as Nyaniso. In 2019, he played Victor in the kykNET police procedural series Die Spreeus. In 2020, he appeared in another kykNET police procedural series Projek Dina as Constable Conjwa. That same year, he appeared in John Pogue's Hollywood sci-fi film Deep Blue Sea 3. Then he played Willy in the 2020 Fugard Theatre production of Master Harold produced by Athol Fugard.

Apart from local television, he had a supporting role in the series Rugby Motors and Black Sails (2013). He also appeared in theatre productions such as Chance Musical, Passport to Tele Land, Beyond All Reason, Sofia is Gone and Faces of Betrayal.

Filmography

References

External links
 

1988 births
Living people
South African male film actors
People from Port Elizabeth